Giorgi Makaridze (born 31 March 1990) is a Georgian professional footballer who plays as a goalkeeper for Portuguese club Marítimo and the Georgia national team.

He previously played for Dinamo Tbilisi, Le Mans, Doxa Katokopia, Feirense, Moreirense, F.C Rio Ave and Almería.

Club career
Born in Tbilisi, Makaridze began his career in the Dinamo Tbilisi academy, afterwards moving to Le Mans UC72 on January 10, 2009, for €800,000 on a four-year contract worth €85,000.

In April 2014, he would leave Le Mans for Doxa Katokopia, but would never play a single game for the Cypriot club, leaving them for Feirense in Portugal, who were in Segunda Division Portugal at the time, playing 54 games. After getting promoted to Liga Nos, Makaridze joined Moreirense,  playing 33 games and winning the 2017 Taça da Liga with them. In 2018 there was a rumor that Makaridze would join Benfica, but this move would never materialise, and instead he signed with Rio Ave. He would later agree to mutually terminate his contract with them, joining Vitoria FC in January of the same season.

On 12 September 2020, Makaridze moved away from the Portuguese league to sign a two-year contract with Segunda División side UD Almería. He was released by the club on 3 June 2022 as his contract was due to expire, and joined SD Ponferradina on 4 July.

On 9 January 2023, after being mainly a backup to Amir Abedzadeh, Makaridze left Ponfe.

On 11 January 2023, Makaridze signed a year-and-a-half contract with Marítimo in Portugal.

International career
Giorgi Makaridze was a member of Georgia U17 team and played 10 games there. He also participated in Georgia U19 (played 8 games) and Georgia U21 (played 9 games). At age of 17, Makaridze established himself as a great prospect and starter for the Georgia national football team along with other teenagers such as Levan Kenia and Levan Mchedlidze. Currently he has played 14 games in Georgian National Football Team.

Career statistics

Honours

Club
Moreirense
Taça da Liga: 2016–17

Almería
Segunda División: 2021–22

Individual
Segunda Liga Best Goalkeeper: 2015–16

References

External links

UEFA Profile

1990 births
Footballers from Tbilisi
Living people
Association football goalkeepers
Footballers from Georgia (country)
Georgia (country) international footballers
Georgia (country) under-21 international footballers
FC Dinamo Tbilisi players
Le Mans FC players
Doxa Katokopias FC players
C.D. Feirense players
Moreirense F.C. players
Rio Ave F.C. players
Vitória F.C. players
UD Almería players
SD Ponferradina players
C.S. Marítimo players
Ligue 1 players
Ligue 2 players
Primeira Liga players
Liga Portugal 2 players
Segunda División players
Expatriate footballers from Georgia (country)
Expatriate footballers in France
Expatriate sportspeople from Georgia (country) in France
Expatriate footballers in Cyprus
Expatriate sportspeople from Georgia (country) in Cyprus
Expatriate footballers in Portugal
Expatriate sportspeople from Georgia (country) in Portugal
Expatriate footballers in Spain
Expatriate sportspeople from Georgia (country) in Spain